National Peiyang University (北洋大学堂), originally Imperial Tientsin University, was established in Tianjin in October 1895 by Sheng Xuanhuai, the official of the Tianjin Customs, with the approval of the Guangxu Emperor of Qing dynasty. It was the first government-run university in modern China where western science & technology was its main focus. The school motto was "Seeking truth from facts"（实事求是). In 1951, by Chinese government's order, the university was renamed as Tianjin University.

In 1912, it was renamed National Peiyang University, and the following year it was renamed National Peiyang University. In 1917, Peiyang University merged into Peking University. By 1920, Peiyang University began to specialize in engineering education. In 1928, the National Government promoted the university district system. During this period, the school was renamed as the Second Institute of Engineering at National Peiping University. 

The following year the university district system was abolished. The original Peiyang University was retired from Peking University. Because it was specialized in engineering, it was not in accordance with the university system. Peiyang Institute of Technology. In 1937, due to the War of Resistance Against Japanese Aggression, the National Peiyang Institute of Technology moved west to Xi'an to form the National Xi’an Ad-hoc University and was renamed the National Northwest Associated University in March of the following year. In July, it was reorganized into the National Northwestern Institute of Technology. In 1943, under the auspices of Peiyang University's alumni reunification, the Ministry of Education independently designated Yingsi University’s College of Engineering and established the Taishun Peiyang Institute of Technology. Affected by this, Peiyang University alumni established Xijing Branch of Peiyang Institute of Technology in Xi’an. In 1945, when the War of Resistance against Japan ended, Peiyang University alumni's call for returning to Tianjin was growing louder. In January 1946, the Ministry of Education ordered Taishun Peiyang Institute of Technology, Peiyang Institute of Technology Xijing Branch and National Northwestern Engineering College to return to Tianjin for re-establishment. National Peiyang University was demobilized at the site of Xigu, Tianjin, and civil engineering, hydraulic engineering, and mining engineering were established. The five engineering research institutes of metallurgical engineering and chemical engineering actively carry out academic exchanges and scientific research and are known as the “science fortress building a nation”. In 1951, the National Peiyang University was merged with the Hebei Institute of Technology and named Tianjin University.

At present, the campus site of Peiyang University is on the campus of Hebei University of Technology. The existing buildings include Tuancheng, Nanlou and North Buildings. In May 2013, the site of Peiyang University was upgraded to a national key cultural relics protection unit. In September 2016, the site of Peiyang University was selected as one of the first Chinese Architectural Heritage Lists in the 20th Century. Since Tianjin University has inherited the academic ties of Peiyang University, Tianjin University is currently holding the annual celebration of Tianjin University (Northern University) on October 2. Tianjin University has successively established Peiyang Square, 100th Anniversary Peiyang Memorial Pavilion, Peiyang Science Building, 120th Anniversary Peiyang Memorial Pavilion, etc. The celebration of Peiyang University Hall was established in October 1895.

School name

Research on the initial school name 
The name originally used when Peiyang University was founded and the official opening date had a variety of arguments because the files were burned and there was no way to verify. One view is that the name of Peiyang University was "Tianjin Peiyang Chinese and Western School" (天津北洋中西学堂) at the beginning of its establishment. This statement originated from the "Tianjin Chinese and Western School Constitution"（《天津中学学堂章程》) prepared by Sheng Xuanhuai and the "Arrangement of the Constitution of the Tianjin Chinese and Western School"（《拟设天津中西学堂章程禀》) proposed by Sheng Xuanhuai.

Another argument stems from the fact that the Governor of Zhili Province, Wang Wenshao, wrote a memorial to Emperor Guangxu for the purpose of creating a Western School by the head of customs by Sheng Xuanhuai（《津海关道盛宣怀创办西学学堂禀明立案由》). The memorial uses the name of “Tianjin Peiyang Western School”（天津北洋西学学堂). Therefore, Peiyang University（北洋大学堂) is presumed to be under construction. It was originally named "Tianjin Peiyang Western School"（天津北洋西学学堂) and was later renamed "Peiyang University"（北洋大学堂). This is a common saying. This was adopted in the Peiyang University-Tianjin University History published by Tianjin University Press in 1990.

However, scholars who specialize in the history of Peiyang University have verified based on historical data. In fact, when Peiyang University was founded, the initial names of the schools were Peiyang University（北洋大学堂), Peiyang University（北洋大学堂) and its English “Pei-yang-ta-hsiieh-t'ang" appeared in the 1895 Peiking Tientisn Times and Zhili Province Times. Because the school used the "Tianjin Chinese and Western School Constitution" approved by Emperor Guangxu, it caused misinformation.

References 

Educational institutions established in 1895
Major National Historical and Cultural Sites in Tianjin
Education in Tianjin
1895 establishments in China
Tianjin University